LoveShackFancy is an American clothing brand. It sells women's and girls apparel as well as home décor. It was founded by Rebecca Hessel Cohen in 2013.

References

External links
 Official website

Clothing brands of the United States
American companies established in 2013